The Anglo-Norse Society in Oslo is a society based in Oslo, Norway for advancing civil relations between Britain and Norway.

The Society was founded in 1921 on the initiative of Ella Anker, who as a newspaper correspondent in London had been a co-founder of the Anglo-Norse Society in London in 1918. The first president was Fridtjof Nansen.

References

Organisations based in Oslo
Norway–United Kingdom relations
Organizations established in 1921
1921 establishments in Norway
Norway friendship associations
United Kingdom friendship associations